What the Moon Saw is a 1990 Australian film directed by Pino Amenta. The first of five films Boulevard Films made following the success of Boulevard of Broken Dreams (1988), it was based on Howson's memories of being a child actor in the theatre.

The musical performed in the film, Sinbad's Last Adventure was written by Howson.

References

External links

What the Moon Saw at Oz Movies

Australian children's films
1990 films
1990s English-language films
1990s Australian films